Chapel Downs is a suburb of Auckland, New Zealand. It is under local governance of the Auckland Council. The suburb is largely rural but has not become heavily subdivided. The suburb is in the Howick ward, one of the thirteen administrative divisions of Auckland City, and the area is informally considered East Auckland.

Suburbs of Auckland
Ōtara-Papatoetoe Local Board Area